The 2016 MTV Video Music Awards Japan was held in Tokyo on October 26, 2016 and was hosted by Rip Slyme.

Nominees
Nominations were announced on September 1, 2016.

Best Video of the Year
Hikaru Utada — "Manatsu no Tōriame"

Best Male Video

Japan
Yu Takahashi — "Hikari no Hahen"
 AK-69 — "Flying B"
 Daichi Miura — "Cry & Fight"
 Motohiro Hata — "Sumire"
 Rekishi (feat. Morino Ishimatsu) — "Saigo no Shogun"
 Yu Takahashi — "Hikari no Hahen"

International
Justin Bieber — "Sorry"
 Drake — "Hotline Bling"
 James Bay — "Let It Go"
 Justin Timberlake — "Can't Stop the Feeling!"
 The Weeknd — "Can't Feel My Face"

Best Female Video

Japan
Hikaru Utada — "Manatsu no Tōriame"
 Namie Amuro — "Mint"
 Juju — "What You Want"
 Kyary Pamyu Pamyu — "Sai & Go"
 Kana Nishino — "Anata no Suki na Tokoro"

International
Ariana Grande — "Into You"
 Adele — "Hello"
 Beyoncé — "Formation"
 Rihanna (feat. Drake) — "Work"
 Sia — "Cheap Thrills (Performance Edit)"

Best Group Video

Japan
Exile The Second — "Shut Up!! Shut Up!! Shut Up!!"
 Babymetal — "Karate"
 Perfume — "Flash"
 Vamps (feat. Chris Motionless of Motionless in White) — "Inside of Me"
 The Yellow Monkey — "Alright"

International
Fifth Harmony (feat. Ty Dolla Sign) — "Work from Home"
 Coldplay — "Up & Up"
 Pentatonix — "Can't Sleep Love"
 The 1975 — "Ugh!"
 The Vamps — "Wake Up"

Best New Artist Video

Japan
Suchmos — "Mint"
 Ame no Parade — "You"
 Boku no Lyric no Bōyomi — "Newspeak"
 Faky — "Candy"
 Wednesday Campanella — "Tsuchinoko"

International
DNCE — "Cake by the Ocean"
 Charlie Puth — "One Call Away"
 Halsey — "New Americana"
 Jack Garratt — "Breathe Life"
 Lukas Graham — "7 Years"

Best Album of the Year

Japan
Babymetal — Metal Resistance
 Back Number — Chandelier
 Bump of Chicken — Butterflies
 Kana Nishino — Just Love
 Perfume — Cosmic Explorer

International
Beyoncé — Lemonade
 Adele — 25
 Drake — Views
 Justin Bieber — Purpose
 Rihanna — Anti

Best Rock Video
Alexandros — "Swan"
 Coldplay — "Up & Up"
 Radiohead — "Daydreaming"
 Red Hot Chili Peppers — "Dark Necessities"
 The Yellow Monkey — "Alright"

Best Metal Video
Babymetal — "Karate"
 Crossfaith — "Rx Overdrive"
 Deftones — "Prayers / Triangles"
 Iron Maiden — "Speed of Light"
 Trivium — "Silence in the Snow"

Best Pop Video
Nissy — "Playing With Fire"
 Ariana Grande — "Into You"
 Fifth Harmony (feat. Ty Dolla Sign) — "Work from Home"
 Justin Bieber — "What Do You Mean?"
 Kana Nishino — "Anata no Suki na Tokoro"

Best R&B Video
Daichi Miura — "Cry & Fight"
 Alessia Cara — "Here"
 Bryson Tiller — "Don't"
 Usher (feat. Young Thug) — "No Limit"
 The Weeknd — "Can't Feel My Face"

Best Hip Hop Video
AK-69 — "Flying B"
 Chance the Rapper (feat. Saba) — "Angels"
 Drake — "Hotline Bling"
 Desiigner — "Panda"
 Kanye West — "Famous"

Best Dance Video
Boom Boom Satellites — "Lay Your Hands on Me"
 Calvin Harris (feat. Rihanna) — "This Is What You Came For"
 Disclosure (feat. Lorde) — "Magnets"
 Kygo (feat. Maty Noyes) — "Stay"
 Mike Posner — "I Took a Pill in Ibiza (Seeb Remix)"

Best Choreography
Generations from Exile Tribe — "Ageha"
 Beat Buddy Boi — "B-Boi Scramble"
 Fifth Harmony (feat. Ty Dolla Sign) — "Work from Home"
 Justin Bieber — "Sorry"
 Sia — "Alive"

Special awards

Best Teen Choice Award
Sakura Fujiwara — "Soup"
 Doberman Infinity — "Ga Ga Summer"
 Scandal — "Take Me Out"
 Sky-Hi — "Nanairo Holiday"
 Rei Yasuda — "Message"

Inspirational Award Japan
The Yellow Monkey

References

External links
 MTV Video Music Awards Japan website

2016 in Japanese music
2016 music awards